Celebrando is a compilation album released by Juan Gabriel in 2012. The album features Los Hermanos Zavala.

Track listing

References 

Juan Gabriel compilation albums
2012 greatest hits albums